Charles Edward Anton (1860 – 16 November 1935) was a Scottish businessman who was the 16th tai-pan of the Jardine, Matheson & Co. and a member of the Legislative Council of Hong Kong.

Biography
Anton was born in St Pancras, London, to Scottish parents George Anton, a merchant, and Mary Lindsay. He joined the Jardine, Matheson & Co. in 1884 and spent some time in the Shanghai office. He was authorised to sign per pro in 1904. In 1910, he was appointed a director and eventually retired in 1919. During 1917 when he was the director of Jardine he was also member of the Hong Kong General Chamber of Commerce and the Legislative Council of Hong Kong.

Anton died of pneumonia at Broughty Ferry, Dundee, Scotland on 16 November 1935, leaving local estate sworn under £225,500 (£ as of ).

Memory
Anton Street in Wan Chai was named after him.

References

1860 births
1935 deaths
Hong Kong businesspeople
Jardine Matheson Group
Scottish expatriates in Hong Kong
Scottish expatriates in China
Members of the Legislative Council of Hong Kong
Date of birth missing
Businesspeople from London
Deaths from pneumonia in Scotland